"Guildo hat euch lieb!" ("Guildo loves you!") was the  entry in the Eurovision Song Contest 1998, performed in German by Guildo Horn & Die Orthopädischen Strümpfe. The song was performed ninth on the night, following 's Dana International with "Diva" and preceding 's Chiara with "The One That I Love". At the close of voting, it had received 86 points, placing 7th in a field of 25.

Written by television host Stefan Raab under the pseudonym "Alf Igel" (a reference to prolific composer Ralph Siegel), the song is a tongue-in-cheek parody of the schlager style for which Germany had become known at previous contests. Horn (whose backing band's name translates as "the Orthopedic Stockings") sings about his desire to return to "a time of tenderness / when 'Caressing' and 'Cuddling' and 'Loving' / were always written with capitals" and "when [he] daily wrote in a poetry book: / 'Yoo hoo hoo – I love you'".

He promises the object of his affections – singing in the third person – that if she is ever sad, he will come to her house and sing songs. Later still he expresses a desire to fly away to the stars, before explaining, "if the stars weren't so far away / and from there I'd send you the proof of my love: / nut wedges and raspberry ice cream". The performance was equally tongue-in-cheek, with Horn climbing on the lighting gantries of the stage while dressed in a green velvet shirt, as well as playing a series of cowbells during the song.  He also came into the audience, and ruffled the hair of Katie Boyle, former Eurovision hostess and guest of honour. Perhaps unsurprisingly, footage of this performance appeared in a montage of "unforgettable performances" at the Congratulations special in late 2005. The single release also saw a video produced with a similarly irreverent take on things.

While the song did not win, it is credited with rekindling German interest in the contest, as well as paving the way for Raab's own entry two years later with "Wadde hadde dudde da?". Following Austria's "Boom Boom Boomerang" and Belgium's "Euro-Vision", it is considered to be the third parody song to make an appearance at the contest.

It was succeeded as German representative at the 1999 contest by Sürpriz with "Reise nach Jerusalem – Kudüs'e seyahat".

Charts

Year-end charts

References

Songs about musicians
Eurovision songs of Germany
Eurovision songs of 1998
Songs written by Stefan Raab
1998 songs
EMI Records singles
1998 singles